Yann Thimon (born 1 January 1990 in Martinique) is a professional footballer who plays as a forward for Club Franciscain and internationally for Martinique.

Thimon began his career with Club Franciscain, moving to Golden Lion in 2015. He returned to Club Franciscain in 2017.

He made his debut for Martinique in 2017. He was in the Martinique Gold Cup squad for the 2017 tournament.

Outside of football, Thimon works as an estate agent.

Personal life
Yann is the brother of the Yordan Thimon, who is also an Martinique international footballer.

References

1990 births
Living people
Martiniquais footballers
French footballers
Martinique international footballers
Association football forwards
Golden Lion FC players
Club Franciscain players
2017 CONCACAF Gold Cup players
2019 CONCACAF Gold Cup players
2021 CONCACAF Gold Cup players